Sharecropper's Seed, Volume 1 is the sixth studio album from Christian artist Nicole C. Mullen. The album was released through Word, Warner, and Curb on April 3, 2007.

Singles
"Convinced" was released as the lead single from the album, and peaked at No. 27.
"One Touch (Press)" was released as the second single from the album. It was featured on the compilation, WOW Gospel 2008. The music video was released on November 10, 2009.

Track listing

Charts

References

Nicole C. Mullen albums
2007 albums